This is a list of some of the prominent U.S. citizens who are known to have been put under surveillance by the federal government of the United States.

Activists 
 Helen Keller 
 Martin Luther King Jr.

Businesspersons 
 Bernard Baruch

 Howard Hughes

Journalists 
 Art Buchwald, a columnist for The Washington Post
 David Halberstam, a Pulitzer Prize-winning journalist, author, and historian
 Ernest Hemingway, winner of the 1954 Nobel Prize in Literature
 Norman Mailer, novelist, columnist and The Village Voice co-founder

 Tom Wicker, a columnist for The New York Times

Politicians

Congress 
 Sen. Barry Goldwater
 Sen. Frank Church
 Sen. Howard Baker
 Sen. Strom Thurmond

Supreme Court 
 Associate Justice William O. Douglas

White House 
 First Lady Eleanor Roosevelt

Science and philosophy 
 Albert Einstein
 Howard Zinn
 Noam Chomsky
 Edward Said

Sports and entertainment

Actors and actresses 
 Jean Seberg 
 Marilyn Monroe
 Marlene Dietrich

Athletes 
 Muhammad Ali

Composers 
 Aaron Copland

Jazz musicians 
 Duke Ellington 
 Frank Sinatra
 Louis Armstrong 
 Nat King Cole

Other
 Robert Hanssen

See also 
 Mass surveillance in the United States

References 

Mass surveillance
Surveillance